María Isabel Rodríguez may refer to:

María Isabel Rodríguez (government official), former Minister of Health of El Salvador (2009–2014); former Rector of the University of El Salvador (1999–2008)
Misa Rodríguez (María Isabel Rodríguez Rivero, born 1999), Spanish football goalkeeper
María Isabel (María Isabel López Rodríguez), winner of the Junior Eurovision Song Contest 2004
María Isabel Rodríguez Lineros, known as Lucía (born 1964), represented Spain in the 1982 Eurovision Song Contest
 Maria Isabel Rodriguez, co-author of two novels with André Launay

See also
 Maria Rodriguez (disambiguation)